The Paddocks, in Crews Hill, Enfield, London, is a farmhouse that is grade II* listed with Historic England. It dates from the first half of the seventeenth century.

References 

Grade II* listed houses in London
Grade II* listed buildings in the London Borough of Enfield
Jacobean architecture in the United Kingdom
Crews Hill
Middlesex
History of Middlesex